Henry Butler-Johnstone (28 August 1809 – 1 April 1879) was a British Conservative Party politician, born Hon. Henry Butler, a younger son of James Butler, 13th Baron Dunboyne. Helater assumed the surname of Johnstone, due to his marriage with Isabella Margaret Munro, daughter of Sir Alexander Munro and niece and heiress of General Johnstone of Corehead.

He was elected at the 1852 general election as a Member of Parliament (MP) for Canterbury, but in 1853 the election was declared void on petition, and the writ was suspended until 1854.

Johnstone regained the seat at the 1857 general election, was re-elected in 1859 and resigned from the House of Commons on 27 January 1862 by the procedural device of accepting appointment as Steward of the Manor of Northstead. At the resulting by-election on 6 March 1862, his son Henry Munro-Butler-Johnstone was elected to succeed him as MP for Canterbury.

Butler-Johnstone died on 1 April 1879 at his residence in Mayfair after a long illness.

References

External links
 

1809 births
1879 deaths
Conservative Party (UK) MPs for English constituencies
UK MPs 1852–1857
UK MPs 1857–1859
UK MPs 1859–1865
Younger sons of barons
Politics of Canterbury